Saad Abdallah Djaballah ( (born on May 2, 1956) in Skikda) is an Algerian politician and leader of the Movement for National Reform (Ḥarakat al-Iṣlāḥ al-Waṭaniyy, also known as the MRN and El-Islah), an Islamist political party that he led in a breakout from the Islamic Renaissance Party (al-Nahda), which he had created but lost control over. Djaballah stood for the presidency twice, in 1999 and 2004. In the former contest, he withdrew along with all other opposition candidates just hours before voting commenced. In 2004, he came in third place in the elections, with about 5 percent of the vote.

In 2011, Djaballah formed of the Justice and Development Front.

References 

1956 births
Living people
People from Skikda
Movement for National Reform politicians
Algerian democracy activists
Islamic democracy activists
21st-century Algerian people